Charles Snowden Fairfax, 10th Lord Fairfax of Cameron (March 8, 1829 – April 4, 1869) was an American Democratic politician of California. He held a Scottish peerage. Fairfax was lured west as part of the gold rush. The town of Fairfax, California, is named for him.

Early life and family
He was born on Vaucluse Plantation in Virginia, the eldest son of Albert Fairfax (April 15, 1802 – May 9, 1835) and Caroline Eliza Snowden (April 21, 1812 – December 28, 1899), who were married on April 7, 1828. His younger brother was John Fairfax, 11th Lord Fairfax of Cameron (September 13, 1830 – September 28, 1900), who became the 11th Lord Fairfax of Cameron upon Charles' death in 1869. His paternal grandfather was Thomas Fairfax, 9th Lord Fairfax of Cameron (1762–1846). On May 1, 1838, his mother married William R. Saunders.

Lineage 
He was collaterally related to Thomas Fairfax, 3rd Lord Fairfax, who was a Parliamentary general during the English Civil Wars. He was also related to Thomas Fairfax, 6th Lord Fairfax of Cameron, who relinquished his English estates to his brother Robert Fairfax, 7th Lord Fairfax of Cameron and emigrated to America, where he settled on a plantation of more than five million acres (4,000 km2) in Virginia, which he inherited from his mother, Catherine Colepeper. Thomas Fairfax was the first person to employ George Washington as a surveyor.

The 7th Lord, Robert Fairfax, died without issue in 1793 and the title passed to an American second cousin, the Rev. Bryan Fairfax, 8th Lord Fairfax of Cameron (1736–1802), a priest of the Episcopal Church and rector of a parish in Alexandria, who was the son of William Fairfax (1691–1757) of Belvoir and Deborah Clarke (1707–1747). The clergyman then became the 8th Lord Fairfax of Cameron. Bryan Fairfax, whose wife was Elizabeth Cary (1730–1757), was succeeded in 1802 by his eldest son, Thomas Fairfax (1762–1846).

Thomas Fairfax, 9th Lord Fairfax of Cameron married three times; his son by his third wife, Margaret Herbert (1783–1858), Albert, who had died during the lifetime of his father, left two sons, Charles and John. Therefore, Charles S. Fairfax, the grandson of Thomas, the 9th Lord, succeeded to the title of Lord Fairfax in 1846—a title, however, that he never claimed, preferring to live as an American citizen.

California 
Fairfax, still the potential 10th Lord Fairfax of Cameron, left Richmond, Virginia, with 74 other gold-seekers on the ship Glenmore. After disembarking and crossing Panama, he boarded a second ship, the steamer California, and arrived in San Francisco on June 23, 1850.

The life of a miner in the mother lode of California might have been somewhat of a shock to Fairfax, who grew up as a gentleman farmer, but he stuck with the endeavor for a while. He prospected extensively, only to lose whatever money he made as fast as he got hold of it. There were stories of him working for others, pushing a wheelbarrow, or tending a mule pulling a cart of gravel and sloshing about in the mud of the diggings.

In 1851, he abandoned the goldfields and turned to a new calling—politics—and became a delegate to the Democratic National Convention. Fairfax was a member of the California State Assembly, first representing Yuba and Sierra Counties from 1853 to '54, then Yuba County alone from 1854 to '55. He served as Speaker of the Assembly in 1854. He subsequently served as Clerk of the Supreme Court of California, 1856–'61. From 1865 to 1867, he was a Supervisor of Marin County.

Personal life 
In 1854, Fairfax met his wife, Ada Benham (1833–1888), in San Francisco. They were married on January 10, 1855, in Louisville, Kentucky, at the home of her stepsister, Henrietta Prentice. They had no children.

Estate in California
After their return to San Francisco, Fairfax and his bride visited his boyhood friend Dr. Alfred Taliaferro at his country home in Marin County. When they expressed their great admiration of his estate, he gave them the property as a wedding gift. Thus, in 1855, the couple became residents of what would eventually become the town of Fairfax.

They made many improvements to their new property. Fairfax imported game birds to satisfy his zeal for hunting and improve his chances for success. Ada planted trees and flowers around the home and grounds and named the estate Bird's Nest Glen, which is now on the National Register of Historic Places as California Registered Historical Landmark No. 679.

They entertained lavishly and it became so customary for their friends to say, "Let's go to the Fairfax's," or "Let's go to Fairfax," that the area took on the identity of Fairfax, which continued long after their departure, up to the time of the town's incorporation in 1931.

The Fairfax estate was also near the site of the last political duel fought in California, on the afternoon of May 25, 1861, between State Assemblymen Daniel Showalter and Charles W. Piercy. Though Fairfax served them lunch and tried to dissuade them, the two men walked to a grassy meadow and fired rifles at 40 paces; Piercy was killed by the second volley.

Death 

Charles S. Fairfax died suddenly, at age 40, at Barnum's City Hotel in Baltimore, Maryland, after having traveled east as a chairman of the California delegation to the Democratic National Convention, which was assembled in New York City. He is interred in Rock Creek Cemetery, Washington, D.C., as is his widow.

Fairfax was thoroughly identified with the state of his adoption, and was well known and respected on the Pacific coast. He stood high in the Masonic fraternity, the members of which arranged to send a large delegation at the time of his death.

References

Sources
 New York Times, April 7, 1869, from the Baltimore Sun, April 5, "Death of a Lineal Descendant of Lord Fairfax in Baltimore," p. 11.
 Aberdeen Journal, Notes and Queries, Vol. I, "The Fairfax Peerage," p. 158.
 1860 Sacramento Co., CA, U.S. Federal Census, Sacramento Ward 1, June 11, sht. 44, p. 43 B, line 18.
 San Francisco Ship Passenger Lists, Volume I (1850–1864), p. 17.
 California Inter Pocula, by Hubert Howe Bancroft, "Duelling," p. 776.
 Fairfax, by William Sagar and Brian Sagar, "Charles Snowden Fairfax," Ch. 3, pp. 15–17.
 New York Times, September 30, 1900, "Titled American Dead," p. 7.
 Rock Creek Cemetery, Washington, District of Columbia, sexton records.
 Lord and Lady Fairfax, Fairfax Historical Society, Fairfax California, July 2002
 More about Charles and Ada Fairfax, Fairfax Historical Society, Fairfax California, Fall 2004

External links 

 Charles S. Fairfax at the Political Graveyard
 MarinDirect.com – Bio. of Charles S. Fairfax with photo
 California Historical Landmark 679: Home of Charles S. Fairfax
 Journal of San Diego History – Showalter and Piercy

1829 births
1869 deaths
19th-century American Episcopalians
American people of English descent
American people of Scottish descent
Burials at Rock Creek Cemetery
County supervisors in California
Charles S
People from Fairfax County, Virginia
People from Fairfax, California
People of the California Gold Rush
Speakers of the California State Assembly
Democratic Party members of the California State Assembly
Lords Fairfax of Cameron